The 2000 Nuneaton and Bedworth Borough Council election to the Nuneaton and Bedworth Borough Council were held in May 2000. The Labour Party retained control of the council.

After the election, the composition of the council was:

 Labour 35
 Conservatives 10

Election result

References

2000
2000 English local elections
20th century in Warwickshire